Too Hot for TV is the only studio album by hip hop group Bad Boy's Da Band. The album was release through Universal Records and P. Diddy's Bad Boy Entertainment. It was certified Gold by the RIAA for sales of over 500,000 copies. Two singles, "Tonight" and "Bad Boy This, Bad Boy That", were released from the album.

Track listing

Singles
"Bad Boy This, Bad Boy That"
"Tonight"

Charts

Weekly charts

Year-end charts

References

2003 debut albums
Da Band albums
Bad Boy Records albums